Akona is a small village 15 km south-east of Kulpahar. It has ruins from the Chandela period.

References 

Bundelkhand
Villages in Mahoba district